A collar beam or collar is a horizontal member between two rafters and is very common in domestic roof construction. Often a collar is structural but they may be used simply to frame a ceiling. A collar beam is often called a collar tie but this is rarely correct. A tie in building construction is an element in tension rather than compression and most collar beams are designed to work in compression to keep the rafters from sagging. A collar near the bottom of the rafters may replace a tie beam and be designed to keep the rafters from spreading, thus are in tension: these are correctly called a collar tie.

Etymology
Collar in general comes from Latin collare meaning neck.

Collar beam roofs
The simplest form of roof framing is a common rafter roof. This roof framing has nothing but rafters and a tie beam at the bottoms of the rafters. The next step in the development of roof framing was to add a collar, called a collar beam roof. Collar beam roofs are suitable for spans up to around (4.5 meters).

Crown post roof framing
A crown post is a compression member, a post, in roof framing which carries a longitudinal beam called a crown plate. The crown plate in turn carries collar beams which help support and carry the rafters, thus collar beams are always found in crown post roof framing.

Arched brace roof
The arch brace truss is made by adding two braces between the rafters and collar. This puts the collar and the braces in tension.

References

Roofs